The Busk Medal is an award given annually by the Royal Geographical Society, for "conservation research or for fieldwork abroad in geography or in a geographical aspect of an allied science". It was first awarded in 1975, and is named in honour of Douglas Laird Busk (1906-1990), a former diplomat, mountaineer, and honorary vice-president of the Society.

Winners

References

External links
RGS spreadsheet of all medal and award winners: Enter "Busk" in search box to see all Busk Medal winners from 1975 onwards; adjust width of columns to see information about each winner 

Awards of Royal Geographical Society
Awards established in 1975